Attorney General Seawell may refer to:

Aaron A. F. Seawell (1864–1950), Attorney General of North Carolina
Henry Seawell, Attorney General of North Carolina
Malcolm Buie Seawell (1909–1977), Attorney General of North Carolina

See also
Attorney General Sewell (disambiguation)